Murray James Eaves (born May 10, 1960) is a Canadian former professional ice hockey player who played 57 games in the National Hockey League. He played with the Winnipeg Jets and Detroit Red Wings. He now coaches Bantam Tier 1 hockey and lacrosse at Shattuck - St. Mary's school in Faribault, Minnesota. His son, Tyler Eaves, played hockey at Rensselaer Polytechnic Institute. Murray is the brother of the NHL hockey player, Mike Eaves. He was born in Calgary, Alberta, but grew up in Windsor, Ontario.

Career statistics

Awards and honors

References

External links

1960 births
Living people
Adirondack Red Wings players
AHCA Division I men's ice hockey All-Americans
Canadian ice hockey centres
Detroit Red Wings players
EC Hannover Turtles players
EHC Kloten players
EK Zell am See players
HC Varese players
Houston Aeros (1994–2013) players
Ice hockey people from Ontario
Michigan Wolverines men's ice hockey players
Nova Scotia Oilers players
Sherbrooke Canadiens players
Sherbrooke Jets players
Ice hockey people from Calgary
Sportspeople from Windsor, Ontario
Tulsa Oilers (1964–1984) players
Windsor Spitfires players
Winnipeg Jets (1979–1996) draft picks
Winnipeg Jets (1979–1996) players
Canadian expatriate ice hockey players in Italy